David or Dave or Davy Walsh may refer to:

Politicians
David Walsh (politician), Irish senator
David I. Walsh (1872–1947), American politician, governor of Massachusetts, and U.S. Senator

Sportspeople

Footballers
David Walsh (Donegal Gaelic footballer), Donegal player
David Walsh (Tipperary Gaelic footballer) (born 1966), Irish Gaelic footballer
Dave Walsh (Australian footballer) (1898–1975), Australian rules footballer
David Walsh (rugby league) (born 1970), Australian rugby league footballer
David Walsh (Welsh footballer) (born 1979), former football goalkeeper
Davy Walsh (1923–2016), Irish footballer

Other sports
Dave Walsh (baseball) (born 1960), baseball pitcher
David Walsh (cricketer) (born 1946), English former cricketer and current cricket administrator
Dave Walsh (esports player) (born 1984), American professional gamer
David Walsh (referee) (1889–1975), American basketball referee
David Walsh (speedway rider) (born 1963), English speedway rider

Others
David Walsh (actor), American voice actor
David Walsh (art collector) (born 1961), owner of the Museum of Old and New Art (MONA) in Hobart
David Walsh (journalist) (born 1955), Irish sports reporter
David Walsh (mining) (1945–1998), Canadian businessman, founder and CEO of the mining company Bre-X
David Walsh (psychologist), founder of the National Institute on Media and the Family
David Walsh (writer) (born 1949), American film critic and political writer for the World Socialist Web Site
David M. Walsh (born 1931), American cinematographer

Fictional
David Walsh (EastEnders), fictional character